Die Unbesiegbaren is an East German film. It was released in 1953. Werner Peters was one of the actors.

External links
 

1953 films
1950s historical films
German historical films
East German films
1950s German-language films
Films set in Berlin
Films set in 1889
Films set in 1890
German black-and-white films
1950s German films